Boesman and Lena is a small-cast play by South African playwright Athol Fugard, set in the Swartkops mudflats outside of Port Elizabeth in the Eastern Cape, that shows the effect of apartheid on a few individuals, featuring as characters a "Coloured" man and woman walking from one shanty town to another.

Background
In common with much of Fugard's other work, the play focuses on non-white characters and includes an element of social protest. Boesman and Lena was inspired by an incident in 1965 when Fugard was driving down a rural road in South Africa. He noticed an old lady walking along the road in the boiling-hot sun, miles from anywhere, and offered her a lift. She was overcome and cried with gratitude. She told him that her husband had just died and she was walking to another farm. If Fugard had not stopped, she would have spent the night on the side of the road. (It was a common practice in apartheid South Africa for farmers to evict worker's families when the worker died.) What struck Fugard was that the woman was in pain and suffering but was far from defeated. This inspired him to write the play.

Notable productions
The play premiered in 1969 at the Rhodes University Little Theatre in Grahamstown, South Africa. Fugard himself played the part of Boesman, Lena was played by Yvonne Bryceland and Glynn Day, a white actor, played the part of Outa in blackface.

On 22 June 1970, the US premiere, an acclaimed off-Broadway at the Circle in the Square Downtown, starred James Earl Jones and Ruby Dee, directed by John Berry (who would also direct a film version, also titled Boesman and Lena, in 2000). Running for 205 performances until 24 January 1971, the production won Obie Awards for Best Foreign Play, Distinguished Direction, and Best Performance by an Actress.

A revival of the play by the Manhattan Theater Club, directed by the playwright himself (and starring Keith David, Lynne Thigpen and Tsepo Mokone), was produced at New York City Center in 1992. This production won a Lucille Lortel Award for Outstanding Revival and an Obie Award for Thigpen's performance, as well as being nominated as Best Revival of a Play for an Outer Critics Circle Award.

Reception
In 1978, Richard Eder of The New York Times described Boesman and Lena as one of Fugard's "masterpieces" along with works such as The Island and Sizwe Banzi Is Dead.

After the 1992 revival, Frank Rich wrote in the same newspaper: "Whether or not you get to the Manhattan Theater Club's revival of 'Boesman and Lena,' you can always see another, informal version of its drama day or night on a Manhattan sidewalk or subway platform or vacant lot. Athol Fugard's image of an itinerant homeless couple sheltered within their scrap-heap possessions and awaiting the next official eviction is now as common in New York City, among other places, as it was in the South Africa where he set and wrote his play in the late 1960s. Even at the time of its premiere, 'Boesman and Lena' was recognized as a universal work that might speak to audiences long after apartheid had collapsed. But who would have imagined that the universality would soon prove so uncomfortably literal?" Writing in New York magazine John Simon concluded: "This is an important play, no less so since conditions in South Africa have somewhat improved: The misery may now be as much existential as social. Outside oppressors add to it, but we carry oppression within us."

Film versions
Two film adaptations of Fugard's play, both of the same title — one directed by Ross Devenish, starring Fugard and Bryceland, and the other directed by John Berry, starring Danny Glover and Angela Bassett — were released in 1973 and 2000, respectively.

Publication
Boesman and Lena was first published in 1971 by Samuel French, and has since appeared in other editions of Fugard's works: Boesman and Lena and Other Plays (Oxford University Press, 1978), Three Port Elizabeth Plays: The Blood Knot: Hello and Goodbye: Boesman and Lena (Oxford University Press, 1974, ; Viking Press, 1974), and Blood Knot and Other Plays including Boesman And Lena and Hello And Goodbye (Theatre Communications Group, 1991).

References

External links
 Alvin Klein, "'Boesman,' Prophetic and Brilliant" (review), The New York Times, 10 December 1989.
 Black Rep review
 IMDb film entry for the 1973 version
 IMDb film entry for the 2000 version

South African plays
1969 plays
Literary duos
Plays set in South Africa
South African plays adapted into films
Plays based on actual events
Plays about apartheid
South African drama films
Plays by Athol Fugard
Films shot in South Africa